Constance Wilson may refer to:

 Constance K. Wilson (born 1959), politician from North Carolina
 Constance Wilson-Samuel (1908–1963), Canadian figure skater
 Constance Anne Wilson, British food historian
Constance Wilson, actress in Fair Week and sister of actress Lois Wilson (actress)